Giurescu is a Romanian surname that may refer to:

Constantin Giurescu (historian) (1875–1918), historian
Constantin C. Giurescu (1901–1977), historian, son of Constantin Giurescu
Dinu C. Giurescu (born 1927), historian, son of Constantin C. Giurescu

Surnames
Romanian-language surnames